In Greek mythology, the name Leucus or Leukos (Ancient Greek: Λεῦκος "white") may refer to:

Leucus, son of the bronze giant Talos of Crete and foster son of King Idomeneus. Following the advice of Nauplius, he seduced Meda, wife of Idomeneus, who had been convinced by Nauplius not to stay faithful to her husband, when Idomeneus himself had gone to Trojan War. Leucus eventually killed Meda and took possession of the kingdom; he also killed her daughter Cleisithyra, despite the fact that she was betrothed to him by Idomeneus, and two sons of Meda, Iphiclus and Lycus (or Leucus). Idomeneus was driven out of Crete by Leucus upon return from Troy.
Leucus, a companion of Odysseus, killed by Antiphus.
Leucus, a singer from Lesbos in the army of Dionysus.
Leucus, an epithet of Hermes in Boeotia.

See also 

 11351 Leucus, a Trojan asteroid

Notes

References 

 Apollodorus, The Library with an English Translation by Sir James George Frazer, F.B.A., F.R.S. in 2 Volumes, Cambridge, MA, Harvard University Press; London, William Heinemann Ltd. 1921. ISBN 0-674-99135-4. Online version at the Perseus Digital Library. Greek text available from the same website.
 Homer, The Iliad with an English Translation by A.T. Murray, Ph.D. in two volumes. Cambridge, MA., Harvard University Press; London, William Heinemann, Ltd. 1924. . Online version at the Perseus Digital Library.
 Homer, Homeri Opera in five volumes. Oxford, Oxford University Press. 1920. . Greek text available at the Perseus Digital Library.
 Nonnus of Panopolis, Dionysiaca translated by William Henry Denham Rouse (1863-1950), from the Loeb Classical Library, Cambridge, MA, Harvard University Press, 1940.  Online version at the Topos Text Project.
 Nonnus of Panopolis, Dionysiaca. 3 Vols. W.H.D. Rouse. Cambridge, MA., Harvard University Press; London, William Heinemann, Ltd. 1940-1942. Greek text available at the Perseus Digital Library.

Achaeans (Homer)
Cretan characters in Greek mythology
Epithets of Hermes